Leap Year Glacier is a tributary glacier between Molar Massif and Mount Stirling in the Bowers Mountains of Antarctica, draining southeast into Black Glacier. It was so named by the northern party of the New Zealand Geological Survey Antarctic Expedition, 1963–64, as party members arrived here in the new leap year of 1964 after climbing out of the Sledgers Glacier.

Further reading 
 Gunter Faure, Teresa M. Mensing, The Transantarctic Mountains: Rocks, Ice, Meteorites and Water, P 137

External links 

 Leap Year Glacier on USGS website
 Leap Year Glacier on the Antarctica New Zealand Digital Asset Manager website
 Leap Year Glacier on SCAR website

References 

1964 in Antarctica
Glaciers of Pennell Coast